The Indian Army Armoured Corps is one of the combat arms of the Indian Army. Tracing its origins from the first regiment formed in 1776, the present corps was formed in 1947 from two-thirds of the personnel and assets of the British Indian Army's Indian Armoured Corps. It currently consists of 67 armoured regiments, including the President's Bodyguards.

School and Centre

The Armoured Corps School and Centre (ACC&S) is located in Ahmednagar, Maharashtra. In 1921, six Armoured Car companies arrived and in 1924 the Royal Tank Corps School was established at Ahmednagar to train the personnel of the Royal Tank Corps. This school was the forerunner of the Fighting Vehicle School, which began to impart to driving & maintenance training. The Fighting Vehicle School along with the Machine Gun School, the training regiments, the recruit training centre, Armoured Corps Depot and Armoured Corps Records were amalgamated to form the present school and centre in 1948.

Armour Day

The Armoured Corps of Indian Army celebrates 'Armour Day' on 1 May. It was on this day in 1938 that Scinde Horse became the first regiment to dismount from their horses and move to tanks. The first equipment inducted were Vickers Light Tanks and Chevrolet Armoured Cars.

Naming Convention of the Armoured Regiments

The naming of the regiments reflects its historical origins. The terms Cavalry, Horse and Lancers, which have been dispensed with in the case of units raised post-independence, are historical legacies from the raising and renaming of these units when part of the East India Company's army and/or later the British Indian Army.

Composition of an Armoured Regiment

An armoured corps regiment is commanded by a Colonel ranked officer, who is known as the Commandant of the Unit. An armoured regiment comprises 3 Sabre Squadrons and a Headquarter Squadron. Each squadron is commanded by a Major ranked officer. He holds the appointment of a Squadron Commander.

An Armoured Regiment has around 45 to 50 tanks in all. Each Sabre Squadron consists of 14-15 tanks and one Armoured Recovery Vehicle. 3 tanks are assigned to the Headquarter Squadron, including that of the commandant. Each squadron consists of four troops, each consisting of 3 tanks.

Black Beret

The officers and troops of Armoured Corps regiments wear the Black Berets as opposed to the rifle green and blue coloured berets which are worn by the regiments of other arms and services respectively. The Black Beret gives the Tankman a distinct identity of their own within the Army fold.

Equipment 

The Armoured Corps of the Indian Army is currently equipped with the following tanks- 

 Arjun MBT – Mk.1 variant in use and Mk.1A  under order.
 T-90 – M and S variants with DRDO made upgrades.
 T-72 – M1 variant with upgrades namely Ajeya MK1/MK2 and Combat Improved Ajeya.

List of regiments

The list of regiments forming part of the Armoured Corps of the Indian Army is as follows. This list is as per unit serial number but not as per the order of precedence of the Indian Army. In that list, The President's Bodyguard is first, but is followed by 16 Light Cavalry, 7 Light Cavalry, 8 Cavalry and 1st Horse. As a matter of tradition, each Armoured Regiment has its own "Colonel of the Regiment", an honorary post for a senior officer who oversees the regimental issues concerning the unit.

** The original 5th Horse (Probyn's) was transferred to Pakistan in 1947.

*** Original 6th Duke of Connaught's Own Lancers was transferred to Pakistan in 1947.

Notes

Further reading
Cavalry Officers Association [2000]. Valour Honour Tradition (Vignettes of the Indian Armored Corps 1773 - 2000. Director General Mechanized Forces, Sena Bhawan, New Delhi 110001.
Maj Gen Gurchan Singh Sandhu, PVSM (1987). The Indian Armour- History of the Indian Armoured Corps : 1941 - 1971. Vision Books (incorporating Orient Paperbacks), New Delhi. .
Ashok Nath (2009). Izzat: Historical Records and Iconography of Indian Cavalry Regiments, 1750 - 2007. Centre for Armed Forces Historical Research, United Services Institution of India, New Delhi.

External links
Army official website
Structure of an Armoured Regiment

Administrative corps of the Indian Army
Nationstate armoured warfare branches
Military units and formations established in 1947
Ahmednagar
1947 establishments in India